Remind Me in 3 Days... is the debut studio album by American alternative hip hop duo The Knux, released in 2008. The album reached #23 in the Billboard Top Heatseekers chart. The album received generally favorable reviews, earning a score of 71 at Metacritic.

Track listing

References

2008 debut albums
The Knux albums
Albums produced by the Knux
Interscope Records albums